Yin Guangjun (Chinese: 尹广俊, born 22 October 1992 in Qingdao, Shandong) is a Chinese football player who currently plays for Chinese club Qingdao Great Star.

Club career
Yin started his professional football career in 2011 when he was promoted to China League Two club Guangzhou Youth (Guangzhou Evergrande youth team).  
In 2012, Yin transferred to Chinese Super League side Qingdao Jonoon.
On 29 April 2012, he made his debut for Qingdao Jonoon in the 2012 Chinese Super League against Guizhou Renhe, coming on as a substitute for Zhu Shiyu in the 25th minute.

Career statistics
Statistics accurate as of match played 31 December 2020.

References

External links
YIN GUANGJUN at Soccerway.com

1992 births
Living people
Chinese footballers
Footballers from Qingdao
Qingdao Hainiu F.C. (1990) players
Chinese Super League players
China League One players
Hong Kong First Division League players
Tuen Mun SA players
Association football defenders